The 2008 German Supercup, known as the T-Home Supercup for sponsorship reasons, was an unofficial edition of the German Supercup, a football match contested by the winners of the previous season's Bundesliga and DFB-Pokal competitions.

The match was played at the Signal Iduna Park in Dortmund, and contested by 2007–08 Bundesliga and 2007–08 DFB-Pokal winners Bayern Munich, and DFB-Pokal runners-up Borussia Dortmund. Dortmund won the match 2–1 to claim the unofficial title.

Teams

Match

Details

See also
 2007–08 Bundesliga
 2007–08 DFB-Pokal

References

Unofficial 2008
Borussia Dortmund matches
FC Bayern Munich matches
2008–09 in German football cups